Nordic combined at the 2014 Winter Olympics was held at the RusSki Gorki Jumping Center. The three events took place between 12–20 February 2014.

Competition schedule
The following is the competition schedule for all three events.

All times are (UTC+4).

Medal summary

Medal table

Events

Qualification

A total of 55 quota spots were available to athletes to compete at the games. A maximum of 5 athletes could be entered by a National Olympic Committee. Competitors were eligible to compete if they have scored points at a World or Continental cup event during the qualification period of July 2012 to 19 January 2014. The top 55 on the Olympic quota allocation list respecting the maximum of 5 per country qualified to compete.

Participating nations
55 athletes from 15 nations participated, with number of athletes in parentheses.

References

External links
Official Results Book – Nordic Combined

 
Nordic combined
2014
Winter Olympics
Nordic combined competitions in Russia
Men's events at the 2014 Winter Olympics